Andrei Snezhnevsky (Kostroma – 12 July 1987, Moscow) was a Soviet psychiatrist whose name was lent to the unbridled broadening of the diagnostic borders of schizophrenia in the Soviet Union, the key architect of the Soviet concept of sluggish schizophrenia, the inventor of the term "sluggish schizophrenia", an embodier of history of repressive psychiatry, and a direct participant in psychiatric repression against dissidents. He was an academician of the USSR Academy of Medical Sciences, the director of the Serbsky Institute for Forensic Psychiatry (1950–1951), the director of the Institute of Psychiatry of the USSR Academy of Medical Sciences (1962–1987), and the director of the All-Union Mental Health Research Center of the USSR Academy of Medical Sciences (1982–1987).

Sluggish schizophrenia 

At the height of his power, Snezhnevsky dominated the whole of Soviet psychiatry. He forced the psychiatric community in the USSR and in many of its Eastern European satellites to adopt the diagnosis of sluggish schizophrenia as dogma. Starting in the early 1950s, Snezhnevsky opposed the concept of "soft" schizophrenia but later promoted the same idea under a different title: "slow-flowing", or "sluggish." The term "sluggish schizophrenia" was invented by Snezhnevsky and became widespread by the 1960s. The prevalence of Snezhnevsky's theories directly led to a broadening of the boundaries of disease such that even the mildest behavioral change could be interpreted as indication of mental disorder. Despite his power and virtual monopolies on textbooks and conferences, some prominent Soviet doctors were unwilling to accept Snezhnevsky's methods, such as Iosif Polishchuk in Kiev, and Fyodor Detengof in Dushanbe.

Political abuse of psychiatry 

Snezhnevsky was long attacked in the West as an exemplar of political abuse of psychiatry in the Soviet Union. He was charged with cynically developing a system of diagnosis which could be bent for political purposes and, in dozens of cases, he personally signed a commission decision on legal insanity of mentally healthy dissidents including Vladimir Bukovsky, Natalya Gorbanevskaya, Leonid Plyushch, Mikola Plakhotnyuk, Pyotr Grigorenko. Some of Snezhnevsky's employees say that one day in a selected auditorium, when discussing the situation in the country, he also gave the diagnosis of sluggish schizophrenia to Andrei Sakharov in absentia. Also in absentia, he diagnosed Joseph Brodsky with the same disease and concluded that he was "not a valuable person at all". As Oleh Wolansky noted, professor Snezhnevsky did not hesitate to act against principles of the Hippocratic Oath. On the covert orders of the KGB, thousands of social and political reformers—Soviet "dissidents"—were incarcerated in mental hospitals after being labelled with diagnoses of "sluggish schizophrenia", a disease fabricated by Snezhnevsky and "Moscow school" of psychiatry. The belief that career development depended on loyalty to the Party and that the Party and its interests were cardinal can partly explain why Snezhnevsky, who earnestly defended the rights of his patients at the frontline hospital during the massive destruction of World War II, also employed his scientific regalia and academic title to legitimate the psychiatric confinement of dissenters. However, Alexander Tiganov, a pupil of Snezhnevsky and full member of the Russian Academy of Medical Sciences, believes his teacher was honest in his diagnosing dissenters. In 2011, Tiganov said it was rumored that Snezhnevsky took pity on dissenters and gave them a diagnosis required for placing in a special hospital to save them from a prison, but it was not true, he honestly did his medical duty. The same ideas are voiced in the 2014 interview by Anatoly Smulevich, a pupil of Snezhnevsky, full member of the Russian Academy of Medical Sciences; he says what was attributed to Snesnevsky was that he recognized the healthy as the ill, it did not happen and is pure slander, it is completely ruled out for him to give a diagnosis to a healthy person.

Discredit at the Royal College 
In 1980, the Special Committee on the Political Abuse of Psychiatry, established by the Royal College of Psychiatrists in 1978, charged Snezhnevsky with involvement in the abuse and recommended that Snezhnevsky, who had been honoured as a Corresponding Fellow of the Royal College of Psychiatrists, be invited to attend the college's Court of Electors to answer criticisms because he was responsible for the compulsory detention of celebrated dissident, Leonid Plyushch. Instead Snezhnevsky chose to resign his Fellowship.

Snezhevsky wrote the letter to the president of the Royal College:

The college's Committee on Abuse passed the following judgment:

Other contributions to psychiatry 
In 1968, Snezhnevsky wrote of a distinction between the positive and negative symptoms of schizophrenia, a concept long attributed to Snezhnevky but in fact introduced by John Hughlings Jackson and John Russell Reynolds. The concept came to be increasingly used in schizophrenia research and classification since the 1970s, citing his colleague I.F. Ovchinnikov that the symptoms appear to exist "as if on two levels".

The American Psychiatric Association at its annual meeting held in San Francisco in 1970 honored Snezhnevsky by naming him a "distinguished fellow" for his "outstanding contribution to psychiatry and related sciences."

Snezhnevsky created his own school in psychiatry. The disciples of his school are Ruben Nadzharov, Taksiarkhis Papadopulos, Gregory Rotstein, Moisey Vrono, Marat Vartanyan, Nikolay Zharikov, Anatoly Anufriev, Nikolay Shumsky, Alexander Tiganov, Irina Shakhmatova-Pavlova, Anatoly Smulevich. Snezhnevsky worked together with Smulevich every day for 20 years. In the Soviet Union, Snezhnevsky's school alone had the exclusive right to truth and held key positions in psychiatry. Doctors who wished to gain more knowledge were unable to do so, because all textbooks and handbooks on psychiatry described only the views of Snezhnevsky's school.

Estimations 
According to the psychiatrist Marina Voikhanskaya, Academician Snezhnevsky and his "school" have debased, reduced Russian psychiatry to a semi-amateur level and single doctrine about schizophrenia, in the terms of which alcoholic psychoses and alcoholism are considered schizophrenia; congenial idiocy in the children of alcoholics is considered premature schizophrenia; and dissent is considered schizophrenia with delusions of reform.

As reported by the psychiatrist Boris Zoubok, who worked at the Kashchenko hospital under Snezhnevsky and afterwards settled in the US, Snezhnevsky and his colleagues genuinely believed in their concept of dissent as mental disease and in the method of diagnosis.

According to Moscow psychiatrist Mikhail Buyanov, Snezhnevsky discovered nothing; he muddled everything he attempted, could not find anything.

According to Moscow psychiatrist Alexander Danilin, the so-called "nosological" approach in the Moscow psychiatric school established by Snezhnevsky boiled down to the ability to make a single diagnosis, schizophrenia. 
Such psychiatry, said Danilin, is not science but a system of opinions to which people by the thousands fell victim.  Millions of lives were disabled by virtue of the concept "sluggish schizophrenia" introduced by Snezhnevsky, whom Danilin called a state criminal. However, the founder of the Moscow Helsinki Group Yuri Orlov has the opinion that Snezhnevsky did not willingly participate in the political abuse of psychiatry, and that the real criminal was Georgy Morozov, the director of the Serbsky Institute, who collaborated with the KGB since his students days.

St Petersburg academic psychiatrist professor Yuri Nuller notes that the concept of Snezhnevsky's school allowed psychiatrists to consider, for example, schizoid psychopathy and even schizoid character traits as early, delayed in their development, stages of the inevitable progredient process, rather than as personality traits inherent to the individual, the dynamics of which might depend on various external factors. The same also applied to a number of other personality disorders. It entailed the extremely broadened diagnostics of sluggish (neurosis-like, psychopathy-like) schizophrenia. Despite a number of its controversial premises and in line with the traditions of then Soviet science, Snezhnevsky's hypothesis has immediately acquired the status of dogma which was later overcome in other disciplines but firmly stuck in psychiatry. Snezhnevsky's concept, with its dogmatism, proved to be psychologically comfortable for many psychiatrists, relieving them from doubt when making a diagnosis. That carried a great danger: any deviation from a norm evaluated by a doctor could be regarded as an early phase of schizophrenia, with all ensuing consequences. It resulted in the broad opportunity for voluntary and involuntary abuses of psychiatry. But Snezhnevsky did not take civil and scientific courage to reconsider his concept which clearly reached a deadlock.

In his article of 2002, a former president of the American Psychiatric Association Alan A. Stone, who as a member of team had examined Soviet dissident Pyotr Grigorenko and found him mentally healthy in 1979, disregarded the findings of the World Psychiatric Association and the later avowal of Soviet psychiatrists themselves and instead claimed that there were no political abuses of psychiatry in the Soviet Union. He asserted that Snezhnevsky was wrongly condemned by critics and argued that it was time for psychiatry in the Western countries to reconsider the accounts of political abuse of psychiatry in the USSR in the hope of discovering that Soviet psychiatrists were more deserving of sympathy than condemnation.

Helen Lavretsky supposes that a totalitarian regime, the lack of a democratic tradition in Russia, and oppression and "extermination" of the best psychiatrists during the 1930–50 period prepared the ground for the abuse of psychiatry and Russian-Soviet concept of schizophrenia.

Awards 
He was honored with the title of a Hero of Socialist Labour, two Orders of Lenin, four Orders of the Red Star, and the USSR State Prize.

Death 
Having learnt of his diagnosis of lung cancer and facing his death within a few years, Snezhnevsky started lamenting over his making a lot of blunders at the Pavlovian session and departed from his indisputable tone as to his own concept. He died on 12 July 1987 in Moscow and was buried in the Kuntsevo Cemetery.

Interesting facts 
Sneznesky examined Andriy Slyusarchuk as a child, was kind to him and presented him the book Your Abilities, Man used by Slyusarchuk to be taught in the field.

See also 
Political abuse of psychiatry in the Soviet Union
Andriy Slyusarchuk

References

External links
 
 
 
 The letter Tatiana Zhitnikova, Leonid Plyushch's wife, wrote to Sneshnevsky on 14 February 1973 and published in 

1904 births
1987 deaths
People from Kostroma
Writers from Kostroma Oblast
People from Kostromskoy Uyezd
Communist Party of the Soviet Union members
Soviet psychiatrists
Russian psychiatrists
Schizophrenia researchers
Kazan Federal University alumni
Academicians of the USSR Academy of Medical Sciences
Fellows of the Royal College of Psychiatrists
Political abuse of psychiatry in the Soviet Union
Soviet people of World War II
Russian people of World War II
Heroes of Socialist Labour
Recipients of the Order of Lenin
Recipients of the USSR State Prize
Deaths from lung cancer
Deaths from cancer in the Soviet Union
Deaths from cancer in Russia
Burials at Kuntsevo Cemetery